Falerone is a town and comune in the province of Fermo, in the Italian region of the Marche, southeast of Urbisaglia.

History
Almost nothing is known of the ancient town (called Falerio) except from inscriptions. From the remains of its buildings, it appears to have been a centre of some importance in the Picenum.

It was probably founded as a colony by Caesar Augustus after his victory at Actium. A question arose in the time of Domitian between the inhabitants of Falerio and Firmum as to land which had been taken out of the territory of the latter (which was recolonized by the triumvirs), and, though not distributed to the new settlers, had not been given back again to the people of Firmum. The emperor, by a rescript, a copy of which in bronze was found at Falerio, decided in favor of the people of Falerio, that the occupiers of this land should remain in possession of it.

In the Late Antiquity the city decayed, and in the Middle Ages it followed the history of the local lordships.

Main sights
An amphitheatre, less well preserved, also exists. Between the two is a water reservoir (called Bagno della Regina) connected with remains of baths.

References

Further reading

Cities and towns in the Marche
29 BC establishments
Coloniae (Roman)
Catholic titular sees in Europe